Edward Daniel may refer to:
Edward St John Daniel (1837–1868), English soldier and Victoria Cross recipient
Ed Daniel (born 1990), American basketball player